The following are basketball events that are expected to take place in 2020 throughout the world.
Tournaments include international (FIBA), professional (club), and amateur and collegiate levels.

International tournaments

National senior team tournaments
The IOC postponed basketball at the 2020 Summer Olympics to 2021.

FIBA postponed the following tournaments to 2021:
 2020 FIBA Men's Olympic Qualifying Tournaments
 2020 FIBA Women's Olympic Qualifying Tournaments

3X3 championships

Other international championships
The following tournaments were postponed to 2021:
 2020 FIBA European Championship for Small Countries
The following tournaments were cancelled outright:
 2020 William Jones Cup

FIBA youth championships
FIBA postponed the following tournaments to 2021:
 2020 FIBA Under-17 Basketball World Cup
 2020 FIBA Under-17 Women's Basketball World Cup

FIBA canceled the following tournaments outright:
 2019 FIBA Under-16 Asian Championship
 2019 FIBA Under-16 Women's Asian Championship

Professional club seasons

FIBA Intercontinental Cup

Continental seasons

Men

Women

Regional seasons

Men

Women

Domestic league seasons

Men

Women

College seasons

Men's

Women's

Deaths 
January 1—Roland Minson, 90, All-American college player (BYU).
January 1—David Stern, 77, American NBA commissioner (1984–2014).
January 2—Gale McArthur, 90, All-American college player (Oklahoma State).
January 4—James Ratiff, 61, American college player (Howard).
January 6—Ivan Salaj, 58, Serbian player (Crvena zvezda).
January 12—Dick Schnittker, 91, American two-time NBA champion (Minneapolis Lakers) and college All-American (Ohio State).
January 14—Carl McNulty, 89, American NBA player (Milwaukee Hawks).
January 15—Milovan Stepandić, 65, Serbian coach (OKK Šabac, KK Borac Čačak, KK Metalac Valjevo).
January 16—Gene Schwinger, 87, All-American college player (Rice).
January 17—Leo Byrd, 82, All-American college player (Marshall) and gold medal winner at the 1959 Pan American Games.
January 21—Morgan Wootten, 88, American Hall of Fame high school coach (DeMatha).
January 23—Robert Archibald, 39, Scottish NBA player (Memphis Grizzlies, Phoenix Suns, Orlando Magic, Toronto Raptors).
January 23—Kalevi Tuominen, 92, Finnish player (Tampereen Pyrintö) and coach (Finland national team).
January 26—Kobe Bryant, 41, American NBA player (Los Angeles Lakers), five-time NBA champion, two-time Olympic gold medalist (2008, 2012).
January 29—Blagoja Georgievski, 69, Macedonian player (Rabotnički), Olympic silver medalist (1976).
January 30—Terry Fair, American player (Georgia Bulldogs, Hapoel Tel Aviv, Maccabi Tel Aviv).
February 2—Peter Aluma, 46, Nigerian NBA player (Sacramento Kings).
February 2—Ryszard Olszewski, 87, Polish Olympic player (1960).
February 5—Bill Oates, 80, American college coach (Saint Mary's, Menlo, The Master's).
February 6—Dick Atha, 88, American NBA player (New York Knicks, Detroit Pistons).
February 8—Maurice Girardot, 98, French Olympic silver medalist (1948).
February 8—Bill Robinson, 71, Canadian Olympic player (1976).
February 9—Don Coleman, 87, American high school coach.
February 16—Henry Akin, 75, American NBA and ABA player (New York Knicks, Seattle SuperSonics, Kentucky Colonels).
February 16—Ed Murphy, 78, American college coach (Ole Miss, West Georgia).
February 26—Carl Slone, 83, American college coach (George Washington, Richmond)
March—Jeff Taylor, 60, American NBA player (Houston Rockets, Detroit Pistons).
March 5—Levan Moseshvili, 79, Georgian player, Olympic silver medalist (1964).
March 12—Juha Harjula, 77 Finnish Olympic player (1964).
March 18—John Erickson, 92, American college coach (Lake Forest, Wisconsin) and NBA general manager (Milwaukee Bucks).
March 20—Borislav Stanković, 94, Hall of Fame Serbian player and coach, Secretary General of FIBA.
March 21—Leroy Wright, 82, American ABA player (Pittsburgh Pipers).
March 22—Gene Brown, 84, All-American college player and two-time national champion (San Francisco).
March 22—Jack Krumpe, 84, American NBA executive (New York Knicks).
March 24—David Edwards, 48, American player (Texas A&M, BC Šilutė, KR).
March 25—Aric del Rosario, 80, Filipino coach (UST Growling Tigers, Pampanga Dragons, Perpetual Altas).
March 26—Curly Neal, 77, American player (Harlem Globetrotters).
March 26—Mekia Valentine, 32, American player.
March 27—Les Hunter, 77, American NBA and ABA player, college national champion at Loyola (1963).
April 2—Carl Tacy, 87, American college coach (Marshall, Wake Forest).
April 7—Harv Schmidt, 83, American college player and coach (Illinois).
April 12—Sascha Hupmann, 49, German player (Evansville, Alba Berlin, Panathinaikos).
April 12—Rubén Menini, 96, Argentine Olympic player (1948, 1952).
April 13—Charlie Harrison, 70, American college coach (New Mexico, East Carolina).
April 15—Alfonso Marquez, 82, Filipino Olympic player (1960, 1968).
April 22—Dan Mazzulla, 61, American high school coach.
April 23—Chris Marcus, 40, American college player (Western Kentucky).
April 26—Abolfazl Salabi, 95, Iranian Olympic player (1948).
April 27—Mark McNamara, 60, American NBA player (Philadelphia 76ers, Kansas City Kings, San Antonio Spurs, Los Angeles Lakers, Orlando Magic).
April 29—Gerson Victalino, 60, Brazilian Olympic player (1984, 1988, 1992).
May 1—Lajos Engler, 91, Serbian player (KK Proleter Zrenjanin, KK Partizan)
May 1—Reuben Perach, 87, Israeli Olympic player (1952).
May 2—Maret-Mai Otsa, 89, Estonian player, FIBA World champion (1959).
May 3—Rick Roberson, 72, American NBA player (Los Angeles Lakers, Cleveland Cavaliers, Portland Trail Blazers, New Orleans Jazz, Kansas City Kings).
May 4—Marvin Hershkowitz, 89, American player.
May 4—Álvaro Teherán, 54, Colombian player (Baloncesto Málaga, Fort Wayne Fury, KK Olimpija).
May 5—Sonny Cox, 82, American high school coach (King College Prep).
May 5—Connie Rea, 89, American NBA player (Baltimore Bullets).
May 7—Mike Storen, 84, American professional league commissioner (ABA, CBA, GBA) and ABA/NBA executive (Indiana Pacers, Kentucky Colonels, Atlanta Hawks).
May 9—Johnny McCarthy, 86, American NBA player (Cincinnati Royals, St. Louis Hawks, Boston Celtics) and coach (Buffalo Braves, Canisius).
May 14—Jim Tucker, 87, American NBA player (Syracuse Nationals) and college All-American (Duquesne).
May 16—Tony Yates, 82, American college All-American player and coach (Cincinnati), two-time NCAA champion (1961, 1962).
May 19—Ken Burmeister, 72, American college coach (UTSA, Loyola, Incarnate Word).
May 22—Jerry Sloan, 78, American NBA player (Baltimore Bullets, Chicago Bulls) and Hall of Fame coach (Chicago Bulls, Utah Jazz).
May 23—Eddie Sutton, 84, American Hall of Fame college basketball coach (Creighton, Arkansas, Kentucky, Oklahoma State).
June 1—Daniel Levy, 89, Israeli Olympic player (1952).
June 2—Wes Unseld, 74, American Hall of Fame NBA player, coach and executive (Baltimore/Capital/Washington Bullets) and college All-American (Louisville).
June 3—Marc de Hond, 42, Dutch wheelchair basketball player.
June 9—Noel Johnson, 47, American college coach (Midwestern State).
June 10—Harry Glickman, 96, American NBA executive and co-founder of the Portland Trail Blazers.
June 11—Earnie Killum, 72, American NBA player (Los Angeles Lakers).
June 11—Cy Strulovitch, 94, Canadian Olympic player (1948).
June 13—Dick Garmaker, 87, American NBA player (Minneapolis Lakers, New York Knicks) and college All-American (Minnesota).
June 13—Nic Jorge, 78, Filipino coach and administrator.
June 23—Justin Love, 41, American player (BK Ventspils, Beijing Olympians, BC Odessa).
June 25—Juan Ostoic, 89, Chilean Olympic player (1952, 1956).
July 3—Charlie Slack, 89, American college player (Marshall).
July 3—Bill Stricker, 72, American NBA player (Portland Trail Blazers).
July 6—Zdzisław Myrda, 69, Polish Olympic player (1980).
July 10—Panagiotis Manias, 87, Greek player (Panellinios).
July 10—Ed Wild, 85, Canadian Olympic player (1956).
July 14—Bea Gorton, 73, American college coach (Indiana).
July 14—Juan Uder, 93, Argentine Olympic player (1948, 1952).
July 16—Vladimir Obuchov, 84, Soviet/Russian coach (Soviet national team).
July 18—Lenzie Howell, 52, American player (Arkansas, Tofaş, Cholet).
July 21—Stanley Robinson, 32, American player (UConn, Iowa Energy, Moncton Miracles).
July 22—Paul Van Roy, 88, Belgian player.
July 25—Lou Henson, 88, American college coach (Hardin-Simmons, New Mexico State, Illinois).
July 29—Kittie Blakemore, 91, American college coach (West Virginia).
July 29—Bob McCurdy, 68, All-American college player (Richmond).
July 31—Mike Gale, 70, American ABA (Kentucky Colonels, New York Nets) and NBA (San Antonio Spurs, Portland Trail Blazers, Golden State Warriors) player.
August 1—Harley Redin, 100, American Hall of Fame college coach (Wayland Baptist).
August 4—Andre Spencer, 56, American NBA (Atlanta Hawks, Golden State Warriors, Sacramento Kings) and Israeli League (Maccabi Rishon LeZion, Ironi Ramat Gan) player.
August 5—Stefan Majer, 90, Polish player (Legia Warszawa).
August 7—Michael Ojo, 27, Nigerian-American player (FMP, Crvena zvezda).
August 17—Boyd Grant, 87, American college coach (College of Southern Idaho, Fresno State, Colorado State).
August 18—Bob Bigelow, 66, American NBA player (Kansas City Kings, Boston Celtics, San Diego Clippers).
August 23—Luigi Serafini, 69, Italian Olympic player (1972, 1976).
August 27—Lute Olsen, 85, American Hall of Fame college coach (Long Beach State, Iowa, Arizona).
August 29—Clifford Robinson, 53, American NBA player (Portland Trail Blazers, Phoenix Suns, Golden State Warriors).
August 30—John Thompson, 78, American NBA player (Boston Celtics) and Hall of Fame college coach (Georgetown).
September 2—Dave Zeller, 81, American NBA player (Cincinnati Royals).
September 5—Dwight Anderson, 59, American NBA player (Denver Nuggets).
September 5—Orlando Bauzon, 75, Filipino Olympic player (1968).
September 5—Smokey Gaines, 80, American player (Kentucky Colonels, Harlem Globetrotters) and college coach (Detroit, San Diego State).
September 6—Tom Jernstedt, 75, American Hall of Fame administrator (NCAA, USA Basketball).
September 11—Sonny Allen, 84, American college (Old Dominion, SMU, Nevada) and WNBA coach (Sacramento Monarchs).
September 17—Joe Ruklick, 82, American NBA player (Philadelphia Warriors) and college All-American (Northwestern).
September 18—Don Feeley, 82, American college coach (Sacred Heart, Fairleigh Dickinson).
September 19—Dick Nemelka, 76, American ABA player (Utah Stars) and college All-American (BYU).
September 20—Garland F. Pinholster, 92, American college (Oglethorpe) and USA national team (1963 Pan American Games) coach.
September 21—Amos Lin, 87, Israeli Olympic player (1952).
September 25—Jerry Oliver, 89, American coach (George Washington, Indiana, Indiana Pacers).
October 14—Armando Herrera, 89, Mexican Olympic player (1960, 1964).
October 15—Warren Mitchell, 87, American college coach (William & Mary).
October 18—Tomás Herrera Martínez, 69, Cuban Olympic bronze medalist (1972).
October 21—Jesse Arnelle, 86, American NBA player (Fort Wayne Pistons).
October 26—Jim Iverson, 90, American college player (Kansas State) and coach (South Dakota State). National college division champion (1963).
October 26—Eddie Johnson, 65, American NBA player (Atlanta Hawks, Cleveland Cavaliers, Seattle SuperSonics).
October 27—Bob Lochmueller, 93, American NBA player (Syracuse Nationals) and high school coach.
October 30—Žarko Knežević, 73, Montenegrin basketball player (OKK Beograd, Fenerbahçe, Yugoslavia national team).
October 30—Nélson Lisboa, 90, Brazilian Olympic player (1956).
November 1—Yalçın Granit, Turkish Olympic player (1952).
November 1—Billy Tubbs, 85, American college coach (Lamar, Oklahoma, TCU).
November 2—Nancy Darsch, 68, American college (Ohio State) and WNBA (New York Liberty, Washington Mystics) coach.
November 4—Shakey Rodriguez, 67, American high school and college (FIU) coach.
November 8—Chuck Mrazovich, 96, American NBA player (Indianapolis Olympians).
November 9—Tom Heinsohn, 86, Hall of Fame American NBA player and coach (Boston Celtics), 8-time NBA champion.
November 11—Mileta Lisica, 54, Serbian-Slovene basketball player (Sloboda Tuzla, Crvena zvezda, Pivovarna Laško, Novi Sad).
November 13—Terry Duerod, 64, American NBA player (Detroit Pistons, Dallas Mavericks, Boston Celtics, Golden State Warriors).
November 14—Norman Taylor, 55, American player (Illawarra Hawks).
November 15—Anthony Stewart, 50, American college coach (UT Martin).
November 17—Walt Davis, 89, American NBA player (Philadelphia Warriors, St. Louis Hawks).
November 18—George Carter, 76, American NBA (Detroit Pistons) and ABA (Virginia Squires, Pittsburgh Condors, New York Nets) player.
November 22—Paul Covington, 86, American college coach (Jackson State).
November 22—Billy Evans, 88, American player, Olympic gold medalist (1956).
November 23—John Oldham, 97, American NBA player (Fort Wayne Pistons) and college coach (Tennessee Tech, Western Kentucky).
November 24—Rose Marie Battaglia, 91, American Hall of Fame high school and college (Bergen Community College, Iona) basketball coach.
November 29—Jack Foley, 81, American NBA player (Boston Celtics, New York Knicks) and college All-American (Holy Cross).
December 1—Kelvin Scarborough, 56, American player.
December 1—Sol Tolchinsky, 91, Canadian Olympic player (1948).
December 8—Goo Kennedy, 71, American NBA and ABA player (San Antonio Spurs, Spirits of St. Louis, Utah Stars, Houston Rockets).
December 10—Nemanja Miljković, 30, Serbian player.
December 11—Jim Burns, 75, American NBA (Chicago Bulls) and ABA (Dallas Chaparrals) player.
December 12—Bird Averitt, 68, American NBA (Buffalo Braves, New Jersey Nets) and ABA (San Antonio Spurs, Kentucky Colonels) player.
December 13—Jimmy Collins, 74, American NBA player (Chicago Bulls) and college coach (UIC).
December 15—Bruce Seals, 67, American ABA (Utah Stars) and NBA (Seattle SuperSonics) player.
December 17—Tom Hanneman, 68, American NBA television announcer (Minnesota Timberwolves).
December 18—Pete Cassidy, 86, American college coach (Cal State Northridge).
December 19—Marjan Lazovski, 58, Macedonian coach (MZT Skopje, Macedonian National team).
December 23—Ron Widby, 75, American ABA player (New Orleans Buccaneers).
December 25—Rich Herrin, 87, American college coach (Southern Illinois).
December 25—K. C. Jones, 88, American Hall of Fame player and coach (Boston Celtics), 8-time NBA champion (1959–1966), Olympic gold medalist (1956), two-time NCAA champion (1955, 1956).
December 28—Cy McClairen, 89, American college coach (Bethune–Cookman).
December 29—James Hardy, 64, American NBA player (Utah Jazz).
December 30—Bob Bessoir, 88, American college coach (Scranton).

See also
 Timeline of women's basketball

References

 
2020 sport-related lists